Kunwar Sushant Singh is the Member of Legislative Assembly from Barhapur from Bharatiya Janata Party. He is a politician from Western Uttar Pradesh who belongs to Thakur (Rajput) caste. His father Kunwar Sarvesh Kumar Singh is former BJP MP from Moradabad.

Personal life
He was born on 25 December 1988 to Kunwar Sarvesh Kumar Singh, a five-time MLA from Thakurdwara and sitting MP from Moradabad. He is married to Kunwarani Sonal Singh. His grandfather Raja Rampal Singh was four-time MLA from Thakurdwara and once MP from Amroha. He has relations with Haldaur Estate  and other Bijnor's princely states.

Political career
He has been a member of the 18th Uttar Pradesh Assembly and was also  17th Legislative Assembly of Uttar Pradesh member. Since 2017 he has represented the Barhapur (Assembly constituency) and is a member of the Bharatiya Janata Party.
He is fifth youngest MLA to be elected in Uttar Pradesh in 2017. He defeated Indian National Congress candidate Husain Ahmad by a margin of 9,824 votes. In 2022, BJP again announced his name as candidate of current legislative seat. He defeated Samajwadi Party candidate Kapil Kumar by a margin of 14,723 votes.

Posts held

See also
Manoj Kumar Singh
Kunwar Bhartendra Singh
Uttar Pradesh Legislative Assembly

References

Uttar Pradesh MLAs 2017–2022
Bharatiya Janata Party politicians from Uttar Pradesh
Living people
1988 births
People from Bijnor district
Uttar Pradesh MLAs 2022–2027